Strupčice is a municipality and village in Chomutov District in the Ústí nad Labem Region of the Czech Republic. It has about 1,100 inhabitants.

Administrative parts
Villages of Hošnice, Okořín and Sušany are administrative parts of Strupčice.

References

Villages in Chomutov District